In geology, a megacryst is a crystal or grain that is considerably larger than the encircling matrix. They are found in igneous and metamorphic rocks. Megacrysts can be further classified based on the nature of their origin, either as:
Phenocrysts, which crystallize in molten rock material (lava or magma) and are hence an earlier crystallization than the matrix in which they are embedded
Porphyroblasts, which develop in solid rock as the result of metamorphism or metasomatism

See also
Xenolith, an inclusion of one rock type in another

References

Notes 
Significance of k-feldspar megacryst size and distribution in the tuolumne intrusive suite, California

Petrology